Armand Pasha (born 17 January 1991) is an Albanian professional footballer who currently plays for Albanian First Division side Iliria Fushë-Krujë as a midfielder.

Club career
A product of the Teuta Durrës academy, Pasha was loaned out to newly formed side Luz i Vogël for the 2008–09 season before leaving Teuta to join KF Laçi in 2009. After just three league appearances in two seasons for KF Laçi he joined Apolonia Fier.

References

External links
 Profile - FSHF
 Profile at UEFA.com
 Profile at Football Database

1991 births
Living people
Footballers from Durrës
Albanian footballers
Albania under-21 international footballers
Association football forwards
KF Teuta Durrës players
KF Luz i Vogël 2008 players
KF Laçi players
KF Apolonia Fier players
FK Sukhti players
KS Iliria players
KF Erzeni players
Besa Kavajë players
Besëlidhja Lezhë players
KS Egnatia Rrogozhinë players
Kategoria Superiore players
Kategoria e Parë players
Kategoria e Dytë players